Sinagoga is a settlement in the northeastern part of the island of Santo Antão, Cape Verde. It is situated on the coast, 4 kilometers east of Ribeira Grande and 18 km north-northeast of the island capital Porto Novo. It is situated on the national road connecting Ribeira Grande and Pombas (EN1-SA02).

Its name means "synagogue" in Portuguese. It is said that the village was primarily inhabited by Jewish people in the second half of the 19th century, and surnames of Jewish origin can still be found in the area.

Climate
Sinagoga has a hot desert climate. The annual rainfall is 291 millimeters.

See also
List of villages and settlements in Cape Verde

References

Populated coastal places in Cape Verde
Villages and settlements in Santo Antão, Cape Verde
Ribeira Grande Municipality
Jewish Cape Verdean history
History of the conversos
Historic Jewish communities in West Africa